Kim Ji-won may refer to:
Kim Chi-won (1943–2013), South Korean female novelist
Kim Ji-won (boxer) (born 1959), South Korean male boxer
Kim Ji-won (actress) (born 1992), South Korean actress
Kim Ji-won (badminton) (born 1995), South Korean female badminton player
Kim Ji-won, South Korean male rapper who goes by the stage name Bobby (born 1995)

See also
Kim Chi-won (footballer)